Hoar Cross is a civil parish in the district of East Staffordshire, Staffordshire, England.  It contains six listed buildings that are recorded in the National Heritage List for England.  Of these, one is listed at Grade I, the highest of the three grades, two are at Grade II*, the middle grade, and the others are at Grade II, the lowest grade.  The parish contains the village of Hoar Cross and the surrounding countryside.  The listed buildings consist of a country house and associated structures, a church, and a milepost.


Key

Buildings

References

Citations

Sources

Lists of listed buildings in Staffordshire